Alexandra Kiick (born June 30, 1995) is an American tennis player. Kiick has won seven singles titles and two doubles titles on the ITF Women's Circuit. In June 2019, she reached her career-high singles ranking of world No. 126. In May 2014, she peaked at No. 214 in the doubles rankings.

Career
Between August 2015 and May 2017, Kiick did not play in any ITF Circuit tournaments. She was sidelined during this time because she was diagnosed with stage-II-skin cancer (melanoma) and severe knee injuries that caused her to be out for a total of three years and two months. She also was diagnosed with mononucleosis. In 2021, she was diagnosed with acoustic neuroma.

Personal life
Kiick's parents are mother Mary, a former professional softball player, and father Jim Kiick, a former NFL player who won two Super Bowls with the Miami Dolphins. Allie described her father as her hero upon his death. She has one brother, Austin. Her mother introduced her to tennis at the age of nine. Kiick was coached at USTA by Kathy Rinaldi and Adam Peterson. Her idol growing up was Kim Clijsters.

ITF Circuit finals

Singles: 12 (7 titles, 5 runner–ups)

Doubles: 8 (2 titles, 6 runner–ups)

References

External links

 
 

1995 births
Living people
Sportspeople from Fort Lauderdale, Florida
American female tennis players
Tennis people from Florida
21st-century American women